Azaera muciella is a species of snout moth. It was described by Schaus in 1913. It is found in Central America, including Costa Rica and Panama.

References

Moths described in 1913
Phycitinae
Moths of Central America